Finnan may refer to:

Places 
Findon, Aberdeenshire, Scotland, known as Finnan

People 
 Aengus Finnan (born 1972), Canadian folk musician
 Connie Finnan (born 1962), Irish professional darts player
 Frank Finnan (1897–1966), Australian politician
 Sharon Finnan (fl. 1988–2015), Australian netball player
 Steve Finnan (born 1976), Irish footballer

See also
 Finnian (disambiguation)
 Finan (disambiguation)
 Finnan haddie

pl:Finan